Bitget is a cryptocurrency exchange and digital asset trading platform founded in 2018. It is registered in the Seychelles.

Background 

In 2020, Bitget launched One-Click Copy Trade, which has amassed more than 80,000 copy traders. The daily trading volume in derivatives reached $8.69 billion as of February 28, 2022.

In September 2021, Bitget entered into a partnership with Juventus F.C. as it's first crypto partner.

In September 2021, Bitget entered into a partnership with DigiMax, an artificial intelligence (AI) technology company.

In early 2022, Bitget announced a partnership with the Turkish football club Galatasaray S.K.. In the same year, Bitget partnered with the Russian eSports organization, Team Spirit.

In April 2022, Bitget introduced automated trading bots on its platform via partnership with CryptoHero. In the same month, Bitget announced its entry into India following India's levied crypto taxation policies.

In August 2022, Bitget launched a protection fund of $200 million to safeguard the assets and ensure security against hacks, and later in November 2022, the company announced it will increase the fund to $300 Million and pledging no withdrawal for at least 3 years.

In October 2022, Bitget announced that it had partnered with Leo Messi

Bitget was named the exclusive cryptocurrency partner of PGL Major Antwerp 2022 and PGL Dota 2 Major Arlington 2022.

Controversy 
In 2021, Bitget lost its license in Singapore when it announced a new K-pop digital currency, Army coin, named after the followers of the famous K-pop boy band BTS. It caused a clash with the BTS agency, Hybe, which released a statement denying links between the token and the K-pop band a day later.

References 

Cryptocurrency companies
Online companies of Singapore
Internet properties established in 2018
Technology companies established in 2018
2018 establishments in Singapore